Granulina melitensis is a species of very small sea snail, a marine gastropod mollusk or micromollusk in the family Granulinidae.

Description

Granulina melitensis is a round mollusk, that looks similar to a sea shell. Common images show it as white, or shades of purple, pink and in between.

Distribution

References

Granulinidae
Gastropods described in 1998